The Territorial Prelature of Huamachuco is a Roman Catholic territorial prelature located in the city of Huamachuco in the Ecclesiastical province of Trujillo in Peru.

History
 On December 4, 1961, the Territorial Prelature of Huamachuco was established from the Metropolitan Archdiocese of Trujillo

Leadership
 Prelates of Huamachuco (Roman rite), in reverse chronological order
 Bishop Pascual Benjamín Rivera Montoya, T.O.R. (2021.03.30 – ...)
 Bishop Sebastián Ramis Torrens, T.O.R. (1990.11.13 – 2018.08.07)
 Bishop Damián Nicolau Roig, T.O.R. (1963.10.23 – 1981.09.13)

References
 GCatholic.org
 Catholic Hierarchy

Roman Catholic dioceses in Peru
Roman Catholic Ecclesiastical Province of Trujillo
Christian organizations established in 1961
Roman Catholic dioceses and prelatures established in the 20th century
Territorial prelatures
1961 establishments in Peru